Vanilla milk is milk with vanilla flavoring in it. The vanilla is sometimes artificial, although other times it is real vanilla. 

Commercially, vanilla milk is manufactured with a variety of main ingredients, including cow's milk, almond milk, and soy milk. Popular brands of vanilla milk include Nesquick and Horizon Organic

References

Flavored milk